Sheybluy-e Sofla (also Romanized as Sheyblūy-e Soflá; also known as Shebīlū-ye Soflá and Sheyblū-ye Pā’īn) is a village in Gejlarat-e Sharqi Rural District, Aras District, Poldasht County, West Azerbaijan Province, Iran. At the 2006 census, its population was 317, in 62 families.

References 

Populated places in Poldasht County